Puerto Carreño is the departmental capital, and a municipality, of the department of Vichada in the Llanos of Colombia.

History

In 1913 the Colombian government created the province (comisaria) of Vichada and it was decided that its capital should be at the convergence of the Orinoco and Meta rivers where there was a small village known locally as El Picacho.  In 1934 the town was renamed after Pedro Maria Carreño, the Colombian Minister of External Relations from 1912 to 1913. The "municipio" (similar to county in the U.S.) was created in 1974.  On July 5, 1991, Vichada's status was updated to "departamento" under the Colombian Constitution and Puerto Carreño was ratified as its capital.

The DANE (Colombian government's bureau for statistics) projected Puerto Carreño's municipal population to be around 10,034 for 2005, based on the 1993 Census. There are some Indigenous tribes within Puerto Carreño's administrative zone as well.

Geography
The municipality of Puerto Carreño is located on the extreme northeastern part of the Department of Vichada bordering to the north and east with the Bolivarian Republic of Venezuela using the Meta and Orinoco rivers as borders. To the south Puerto Carreño limits with the municipality of Cumaribo and to the west with the municipality of La Primavera.

The area of the municipality is uniformly flat, although there is a very slight rise at the town which gave it its original name.

The area of the municipality is within the llanos plains which cover large areas in Colombia and Venezuela. Geologically the municipality of Puerto Carreño lies on the Guiana Shield mostly made up by Cenozoic and Precambric formations, with some low altitude mountains such as the Mounts of Casuarito and the Hormiga and Guaripa mountains.

Climate
Puerto Carreño has a tropical monsoon climate (Köppen Am) with a hot to sweltering dry season from December to March, and a hot and very humid wet season from April to November.

Economy
Economic activity is based on agricultural and ranching activities, fishing, and mining. There is some international trading activity with Venezuelan towns across the Orinoco River international border: Puerto Carreño often trades commercially with the neighbouring town of Puerto Páez in Venezuela. Main products of the region are rice, yuca and plantain. Artisan fishing is practiced on ranches. There are gold and silver mines, exploited in a rudimentary way.

References

External links
  Puerto Carreño official town (alcaldia) website
  Puerto Carreño official municipality website

Municipalities of Vichada Department
Colombia–Venezuela border crossings
Capitals of Colombian departments